Sumaré is a city in the State of São Paulo, Brazil. It is part of the Metropolitan Region of Campinas. The population is 286,211 (2020 est.) in an area of 153.47 km2. The elevation is 583 m. Sumaré was founded in 1868, after being upgraded to a city. Its old name was Rebouças. There is a Honda plant located there for Honda Brazil.

References

External links 
  

Municipalities in São Paulo (state)